Aïcirits-Camou-Suhast is a commune in the Pyrénées-Atlantiques department in the Nouvelle-Aquitaine region in southwestern France.

The people of the commune are known as Aiziriztar.

Geography

Location
The commune is part of the Mixe country in the French Basque Country of Lower Navarre. It is located immediately north of Saint-Palais. Highway D29 runs north from Saint-Palais through the entire commune from south to north and passing through the town. The D529 Highway runs east from the commune to its junction with Highway D134. Highway D933 enters the commune in the southeast and runs north along the eastern side of the commune to exit in the north.

Hydrography
The commune is located in the Drainage basin of the Adour and is watered by the Bidouze, a tributary of the Adour, and it has its tributaries: the Joyeuse and the Eyherachar and Recalde streams.

Places and Hamlets

Aguerria
Ahano
Aïcirits
Aiherguy
Berhouet
Blazy
Bordaberry
Camou
Capou
Changartia
Chourry
Christy (2 place names)
Coutrenia
Elgartemix
Enauthardy
Errecaldia
Escutary
Esquilamborda
Etchart
Etchebestia
Etchecoin
Etchegorria
Eyhera
Eyherabidia
Goyhenetchia
Halsague
L'Hippodrome
Hourcadette
Ihitzague
Ilhardoy
Jauberria
Larrabure
Larramendy
Larrania
Larrartia
Longynia
Mandachainia
Mendiburia
Mocoroua
Oyhenart
Sagaspe
Salha
Salle
Suhast
Tocoua
Tolospia
Ttarga (craft zone)

Climate
Aïcirits-Camou-Suhast has a oceanic climate (Köppen climate classification Cfb).

Toponymy

The commune's name in Basque is Aiziritze-Gamue-Zohazti.

For Aïcirits, Jean-Baptiste Orpustan proposed the Basque etymology aitz, meaning "high" and aratze, meaning "fern patch", giving "high fern patch" or "rocky fern patch".

He also indicated that Suhast may come from zuhaztoi, meaning "plantation of trees".

The inhabitants of Camou are known as Gamuar and the inhabitants of Suhast are known as Zohaztiar.

The following table details the origins of the commune name and other names in the commune.

Sources:
Orpustan: Jean-Baptiste Orpustan,   New Basque Toponymy
Raymond: Topographic Dictionary of the Department of Basses-Pyrenees, 1863, on the page numbers indicated in the table. 

Origins:
Notaries: Notaries of Labastide-Villefranche
Bayonne: Cartulary of Bayonne or Livre d'Or (Book of Gold)
Ohix:
Navarre: Titles of the Kingdom of Navarre
Biscay: Martin Biscay
Pamplona: Titles of Pamplona

History
The commune Aïcirits-Camou-Suhast was formed in 1972 by the merger of the former communes Aïcirits and Camou-Mixe-Suhast. Between 1972 and 1984, this commune was referred to as Aïcirits. The commune Camou-Mixe-Suhast was formed in 1842 by the merger of the communes Suhast and Camou-Mixe.

Heraldry

Administration

List of Successive Mayors of Aïcirits-Camou-Suhast

Administrative Associations
The commune is linked to the following administrative bodies (non exhaustive list):
the catchment area of Saint-Palais
Local Agency for Employment (ALE) of Biarritz
the social welfare fund of Bayonne
the Chamber of Commerce and Industry of Bayonne Basque Country
the sanitation sector of Bayonne Saint-Palais-South-West-Landes
the subdivision of the Departmental Equipment management of Saint-Palais-Bidache

Judicial Districts
The town depends on the district court of Bayonne, the High Court of Bayonne and the  Court of Appeal of Pau.

Inter-communality
The commune belongs to six inter-communal structures:
the Communauté d'agglomération du Pays Basque
the AEP union for the Mixe country
the energy union of Pyrenees-Atlantiques;
the intercommunal union for regrouping of teaching "Ikas bidea"
the intercommunal union for the operation of the schools of Amikuze
the union to support Basque culture.

Population
Data before 1972 in the table and graph below refer to the old commune Aïcirits, before the merger with Camou-Mixe-Suhast.

Economy
Aïcirits-Camou-Suhast is classified by the INSEE as part of the urban area (unité urbaine) of Saint-Palais, and of the employment area of Oloron-Sainte-Marie.

The registered office of the Lur Berri company, a large food cooperative group, is located in Aïcirits-Camou-Suhast.

The town is part of the designated zone of Ossau-iraty.

It also hosts other companies in the agri-food sector as one of the first fifty two communes of the department:
Union agricultural coop feed livestock (feed manufacturing for farm animals);
Haraguy-Bayonne ham (industrial preparation of meat products);
LBO (food production for farm animals);
Lajournade SAS (industrial preparation of meat products).

Culture and heritage

Languages
According to the Map of the Seven Basque Provinces published in 1863 by Prince Louis-Lucien Bonaparte, the dialect of Basque spoken in Aicirits-Camou-Suhast is eastern low Navarrese.

The village has a cave at Camou (the grotto Oltzibarre) closely linked to the Basque legend of Txahalgorri, the young red bull.

Civil heritage
The former Chateau of Camou (17th century). It contains collections of ancient tools and models of machines from plans of Leonardo da Vinci.

Religious Heritage
The Church of Saint Martin(1841).

Notable People linked to the commune
Martin Landerretche, born on 26 July 1842 at Bussunarits-Sarrasquette and died on 29 January 1930 at Espelette was a bascologue, a priest, writer and a Basque French academic in the Basque language. He was the pastor at Aïcirits.

See also
Communes of the Pyrénées-Atlantiques department

References

External links
AIZIRITZE-GAMUE-ZOHAZTI in the Bernardo Estornés Lasa - Auñamendi Encyclopedia (Euskomedia Fundazioa) 
Aïcirits-Camou-Suhast on Géoportail, National Geographic Institute (IGN) website 
Aïcirits, Camou, and Suhast on the 1750 Cassini Map

Communes of Pyrénées-Atlantiques
Lower Navarre